Soapdish is a 1991 American comedy film directed by Michael Hoffman, from a screenplay by Robert Harling and Andrew Bergman. The film was produced by Aaron Spelling and Alan Greisman, and executive produced by Herbert Ross.

The film tells a backstage story of the cast and crew of a popular fictional television soap opera. It stars Sally Field as a mature soap star, joined by Kevin Kline, Robert Downey Jr., Elisabeth Shue, Whoopi Goldberg, Cathy Moriarty, Teri Hatcher, Garry Marshall, Kathy Najimy, and Carrie Fisher, as well as cameo appearances by TV personalities like Leeza Gibbons, John Tesh (both playing themselves as Entertainment Tonight hosts/reporters), and real-life soap opera actors Stephen Nichols and Finola Hughes.

The film received generally positive reviews. Kline was nominated for a Golden Globe Award for Best Actor – Motion Picture Musical or Comedy.

Plot

Celeste Talbert, the long-time star of the daytime drama The Sun Also Sets, is targeted by her ambitious co-star Montana Moorehead; Montana connives to replace Celeste as the show's star by promising sexual favors to its producer, David Seton Barnes. To make the audience hate Celeste's character, Montana and David come up with a plot change in which she will accidentally kill a young, destitute deaf-mute, played by the newly-cast Lori Craven. Despite the strong objections of head writer Rose Schwartz and Celeste herself, the scene plays out, but is interrupted by Celeste's recognition of Lori as her real-life niece. Network honcho Edmund Edwards sees potential in the relationship and makes Lori a regular cast member, hoping to boost the show's flagging ratings.

Montana and David seek to further unnerve Celeste by bringing back Jeffrey Anderson, an actor whom Celeste arranged to be fired from The Sun Also Sets decades before, after his romantic relationship with Celeste went sour. Bitter at being reduced to performing dinner theater in Florida, Jeffrey relishes the chance to needle Celeste. Outwardly despising Jeffrey but perhaps still harboring some feelings for him, Celeste becomes unhinged when Jeffrey and Lori seem to be about to begin a romantic relationship, seemingly from jealousy. However, when Lori and Jeffrey are about to enact a scripted onscreen kiss, Celeste stops them by revealing that Lori is actually her daughter by Jeffrey. On camera, Celeste explains that she was responsible for getting Jeffrey fired because she was distraught about the pregnancy. Then she went home, passed Lori off as her niece, and had her parents raise Lori, all due to pressure from the network. This incites disgust and scorn from nearly everyone on the show towards Celeste, but the scandal ignites renewed interest in the show, causing the ratings to skyrocket. A board meeting between the show's staff—including Rose, who speaks out in Celeste's defense—takes place thereafter, where David insists that she be fired, but he is quickly overruled as the situation has not only resulted in positive press for the show, but has generated a great deal of public sympathy for Celeste.

The next day, after an unpleasant exchange with Lori, Celeste goes to Jeffrey and pleads with him to speak to Lori on her behalf. Jeffrey is resistant at first, but after Celeste gives him advice on how to approach her and break the ice, the conversation leads to Celeste and Jeffrey embracing. Just when it seems the two are about to reconcile, Montana interrupts them and claims that she and Jeffrey slept together the previous night. Disgusted, Celeste storms off, leaving the situation between her and Jeffrey even worse than before. The dilemma is further inflamed when Rose—who by now is no longer angry with Celeste—shows her a tabloid newspaper proclaiming that Montana is pregnant with Jeffrey's child. After an explosive exchange, Celeste, Jeffrey, and Lori go to the head of the network with their concerns and demand that some action must be taken to solve the problem. But it's Lori who delivers the ultimatum, stating: "Mr. Edwards--it's them or me--that is the bottom line here! They go or I go!"

A decision is made by the network, and the actors head into a live episode still not knowing who will be written off the show. They will read their lines from a teleprompter so that the secret will be kept until the last minute. It is revealed that Lori's character has "brain fever" and will die; still hoping to be rid of Celeste, Montana ad-libs and suggests that a brain transplant can save her. Lori is shocked by the revelation, but in character, Celeste immediately plays along, offering her own brain for the operation. Touched by the sacrifice, Lori asks Celeste and Jeffrey not to leave the show, and softens to her newfound parents. Montana, desperate to stop them, reiterates that she is pregnant with Jeffrey's child, but she is publicly ruined by Rose who, with the help of vengeful Ariel Maloney, who wanted Jeffrey for herself, reveals the secret from a high school yearbook that Montana is actually transgender, formerly called "Milton Moorehead, of Syosset, Long Island". David is shocked and Montana flees the set, screaming in horror. Later, Celeste, Jeffrey, and Lori win soap opera awards while Montana is relegated to performing dinner theater at Jeffrey's former venue.

Cast

Production
Andrew Bergman was called in to write the script. "I thought it was a fun picture and a wonderful cast. I wasn’t on the set all that much, but whenever I was, it seemed perfectly agreeable."

Reception
On Rotten Tomatoes the film has an approval rating of 74% based on reviews from 42 critics, with an average rating of 6/10. The site's critical consensus states, "Soapdish may not be as addictive as the serialized dramas it's spoofing, but a talented cast helps make this affectionate sendup feel fresh." On Metacritic the film has a score of 65 out of 100 based on 19 reviews, indicating "generally favorable reviews." Audiences surveyed by CinemaScore gave the film a grade "A−" on scale of A to F.

Rita Kempley, writing for The Washington Post, called it "pure joy, a lemon-fresh spoof of daytime drama that does the dishing and may even soften your hands. An uproarious look behind the scenes of a fictional soap opera, it soaks the conventions of the genre with unfailing zest to leave a shine so bright you can see your face in it - art mirroring life and all that." Roger Ebert gave the film three-and-a-half stars and called it "the kind of movie that is a balancing act, really." Entertainment Weekly critic Owen Gleiberman gave it a letter grade of C- and said that it "makes the tackiness of soap operas seem far more desperate than funny."

The film was nominated for AFI's 100 Years... 100 Laughs list.

In 2016, Meredith Talusan of BuzzFeed cited it as an example of transphobia, placing Soapdish in a long line of films depicting "the transgender-woman-as-villainess trope in American movie comedies."

Stage adaptation
A stage musical adaptation of Soapdish was workshopped in 2010 and had a staged reading featuring Kristin Chenoweth, John Stamos, and Jane Krakowski in 2012, with a book by Harling, music by George Stiles and lyrics by Anthony Drewe. There were reports in 2016 that Chenoweth was getting ready to star in the work in London the following year. In 2020 the musical made its first public appearance in London at the Turbine Theatre as a workshop production.

Television adaptation
On January 10, 2022, it was announced that a Soapdish television series was in development at Paramount+, with Goldberg reprising her role as Rose Schwartz, and Jennie Snyder Urman serving as co-writer.

References

External links

 
 

1991 films
1991 romantic comedy films
American romantic comedy films
American satirical films
1990s English-language films
Films about actors
Films adapted into plays
Films adapted into television shows
Films directed by Michael Hoffman
Films scored by Alan Silvestri
Films set in New York City
Films shot in New York City
Metafictional works
Paramount Pictures films
Films about trans women
Films about soap operas
1991 LGBT-related films
Films with screenplays by Andrew Bergman
1990s American films